The Azerbaijani Air Forces use mainly Soviet-made combat aircraft. However, most of the aircraft have been modernized and equipped with modern avionics. Currently, Azerbaijan is holding talks with several countries, including Pakistan and Russia, to purchase new-generation aircraft, but so far any aircraft purchase agreement had not signed. The Azerbaijani side is particularly interested in purchasing Sukhoi Su-35 and Mikoyan MiG-35 aircraft from Russia and CAC/PAC JF-17 Thunder aircraft from Pakistan.

Azerbaijan's helicopter arsenal is more modern than in many post-Soviet countries. Thus, most of the helicopters have been upgraded, and a large number of new helicopters have been purchased in the last decade. Azerbaijan is one of the leading countries in the world in terms of the number and use of unmanned aerial vehicles (UAVs). A local factory producing UAVs has been operating in the country since 2011, and Azerbaijani UAVs have been successfully participating in active military operations for more than 10 years.

Most of the Soviet-made systems in the arsenal of air defense forces have also been replaced by modern ones, and Azerbaijan is ahead of most Eastern European and post-Soviet countries in terms of combat capability of air defense forces. Due to a large number of strategic facilities in the country, the Azerbaijani government is paying special attention to the purchase of modern air defense systems.

Aircraft

Current inventory

Retired aircraft

Helicopters

Current inventory

Retired inventory

Unmanned aerial vehicles

Current inventory

Air defense systems

Current missile systems

Radars

Retired missile systems

References

Notes

Bibliography

Azerbaijani Air Forces
Military equipment of Azerbaijan
Azerbaijan
Air Force